Hayati binti Mohd Salleh (or simply Hayati Salleh) is a Bruneian lawyer and the first female Attorney General of Brunei, who served the office from 2009 to 2018. She is also the first female High Court Judge in the Supreme Court of Brunei, as well as the first Bruneian Malay woman to be called to the English Bar. She was responsible for overseeing the implementation of sharia law in Brunei. She was a member of the cabinet in the reshuffles of 2005, 2010, 2015, and 2018.

Name 

Notes

References 

 

Bruneian lawyers
Living people
Year of birth missing (living people)
21st-century women politicians
Bruneian Muslims
Bruneian women in politics
Women scholars of Islam